Cameron D. Russell (born January 12, 1969) is a Canadian former National Hockey League defenceman.

Biography
As a youth, Russell played in the 1982 Quebec International Pee-Wee Hockey Tournament with a minor ice hockey team from Dartmouth, Nova Scotia.

Chosen in the third round of the 1987 NHL Entry Draft (50th overall) by the Chicago Blackhawks, Russell played ten seasons, almost all of which came within the Chicago Blackhawks organization. He finished his career in 1998–99 with the Colorado Avalanche.

The following season, Russell became an assistant coach with the Halifax Mooseheads in the Quebec Major Junior Hockey League, serving from 1999–2002. He returned to the Mooseheads in 2008 as the team's head coach and general manager, moving solely to the general manager role early in the 2010-11 season.

Russell was the GM and architect of the Mooseheads 2013 Memorial Cup win.

Career statistics

Regular season and playoffs

References

External links

1969 births
Living people
Canadian ice hockey defencemen
Chicago Blackhawks draft picks
Chicago Blackhawks players
Colorado Avalanche players
Halifax Mooseheads coaches
Hull Olympiques players
Ice hockey people from Nova Scotia
Indianapolis Ice players
Sportspeople from Halifax, Nova Scotia
Canadian ice hockey coaches